Anna Borgqvist (born 11 June 1992) is a Swedish retired ice hockey forward and former member of the Swedish national ice hockey team, currently serving as an assistant coach to AIK Hockey Dam of the Swedish Women's Hockey League (SDHL).

International career
Borgqvist was selected for the Swedish women's national ice hockey team in the 2014 Winter Olympics. She played in all six games, scoring two goals and adding two assists.

As of 2014, Borgqvist has also appeared for Sweden at two IIHF Women's World Championships. Her first appearance came in 2011.

Borgqvist made two appearances for the Sweden women's national under-18 ice hockey team, at the IIHF World Women's U18 Championships in 2008 and 2009, including winning a bronze medal in the 2009 event.

Career statistics

Club statistics 
Note: Riksserien changed its name to the SDHL in 2016.

International 
Through 2013–14 season

References

External links

1992 births
People from Växjö
Living people
Swedish Women's Hockey League coaches
Swedish women's ice hockey forwards
Olympic ice hockey players of Sweden
Ice hockey players at the 2014 Winter Olympics
Ice hockey players at the 2018 Winter Olympics
HV71 Dam players
Leksands IF Dam players
Brynäs IF Dam players
Sportspeople from Kronoberg County